Abila was an ancient city east of the Jordan River in the Plains of Moab, later Peraea, near Livias, about twelve km northeast of the north shore of the Dead Sea. The site is identified with modern Khirbet el-Kafrayn, Jordan and identified on the Madaba Map as an unnamed icon. There is a widely supported theory that in the Hebrew Bible, it is referred to as Abel-Shittim, as well as in the shorter forms Shittim and Ha-Shittim.

Biblical Abel-Shittim
Abel-Shittim, Hebrew meaning "Meadow of the Acacias", is found only in the Book of Numbers; but Ha-Shittim (Hebrew meaning "The Acacias"), evidently the same place, is mentioned in Numbers, Joshua, and Micah. It was the forty-second and last encampment of the Israelites, associated with infamous Baal-peor incident with the Midianites. It was also the final headquarters of Joshua before he crossed the Jordan.

The location is transliterated as Shittim in the English Standard Version, Geneva Bible, Jerusalem Bible, King James Version, New International Version and New Revised Standard Version. The Complete Jewish Bible and Orthodox Jewish Bible both translate as Sheetim. The Good News Translation has Acacia Valley and the New King James Version has Acacia Grove.

The place is mentioned as a-bi-il-šiṭ-ṭi along with Gilead and described as "the border of the land Bīt Ḫumria (Israel)" in the royal annals of Tiglath-Pileser III.

Identification
Abel-Shittim is identified with the area around Tall el-Hammam, in the Late Bronze Age.

Josephus' Abila (1st century CE)

Josephus stated that there was in his time a town, Abila, "full of palm trees", at a distance of sixty stadia from the Jordan, and described it as the spot where Moses delivered the exhortations of Deuteronomy. In 1906 there was still an acacia grove not far from the place, although palms as mentioned by Josephus were not to be found.

Pliny commented on how the dates of Livias were of high quality both juicy and sweet. Theodosius also praised the dates of Livias stating "it has there some great Nicolas dates" (ibi habet dactalum Nicolaum maiorem). The Madaba Map also depicts the date palms still growing in the area of Livias-Betharamtha in the sixth century AD.

During the First Jewish-Roman War, Abila was captured by the Roman Imperial army, and was used by them to resettle deserters who had joined the Roman ranks.

Identification
The archaeological site of Tell el-Hammam near Abila is identified by some as Livias. Date palms still grow at the edge of Tell el-Hammam.

See also
Plains of Moab

Notes

References

Sources
Talbert, Richard (2000). Barrington Atlas of the Greek and Roman World, Princeton University Press, p. 71,.

Bibliography

 
 Josephus, Antiquities of the Jews, iv.8, § 1; v.1, § 1 (see here at Perseus Project).
 Josephus, De Bello Judaico (The Jewish War) (4.437) (see 4.7.6 at Perseus Project).

Sources

Hellenistic colonies
Torah cities
Former populated places in Jordan